The Secret Life of Pets 2 is a 2019 American computer-animated comedy film produced by Illumination, directed by Chris Renaud, co-directed by Jonathan del Val, and written by Brian Lynch. It is the sequel to The Secret Life of Pets, and the second feature film in the franchise. The film features the voices of Patton Oswalt (replacing Louis C.K.), Eric Stonestreet, Jenny Slate, Kevin Hart, Lake Bell, Nick Kroll, Dana Carvey, Ellie Kemper, Chris Renaud, Hannibal Buress, Bobby Moynihan, Tiffany Haddish, Nick Kroll, Pete Holmes, and Harrison Ford.

The film was theatrically released in the United States on June 7, 2019, by Universal Pictures. It received mixed reviews from critics and grossed $446 million worldwide against its production budget of $80 million, making less than its predecessor, but still turning a profit. A third film is in development.

Plot

Sometime after the events of the first film, Max and Duke's owner, Katie, meets and marries a man named Chuck and they have a son, named Liam, of whom Max disapproves at first due to his rough play but eventually softens up to him. Later, Max's overprotective feelings for Liam develop into an itch which prompts Katie to get him a dog cone from the veterinarian in an effort to lower his symptoms. Max's luck changes when Duke reveals that the family is going on a road trip outside of the city.

When Max and Duke's family reaches a farm owned by Chuck's uncle, Max is first unaccustomed to the farm's ways; including local Welsh Sheepdog Rooster, who tells him to get over his insecurities about Liam and ditch the dog cone. After an incident with the farm's sheep, Rooster takes Max out to find Cotton, one of the missing sheep that ran away. Rooster's teachings and encouragement to Max about acting unafraid prompts Max to successfully retrieve Cotton off a falling tree, earning Rooster's respect.

Before Max left, he had entrusted his favorite toy, Busy Bee, to Gidget. However, Gidget loses Busy Bee in a cat-infested apartment owned by a cat lady. She receives cat lessons and a cat disguise from Chloe in order to sneak into the apartment more easily. Then, with Norman's help, she successfully retrieves Busy Bee and unintentionally gets hailed as the "queen of cats" in the process due to her “catching the red dot”.

Meanwhile, Snowball, who dreams of being a superhero, meets Shih Tzu Daisy, who explains that she needs him to assist her in rescuing Hu, a white tiger she met on an airplane, who is being held captive by an abusive circus owner known as Sergei. Daisy and Snowball sneak into the circus, and in spite of Sergei's pack of black wolves, they free Hu. However, during the escape, Daisy loses her flower clip, which the wolves use to track her down later.

Daisy and Snowball take Hu to Pops' apartment first; Pops reluctantly lets Hu stay for one night, but due to his destruction of the apartment, Hu is kicked out the next day and relocated to Max and Duke's apartment. Around the same time, the family returns from the trip to the farm. Sergei and his wolves track Daisy down and capture her and Hu. Sergei escapes in a circus train in which Snowball, Max, and Norman pursue while contacting Gidget for assistance in the chase. Gidget, Max's friends, and the cats take their owner off in her car, in pursuit of the train.

Max takes out the wolves and Snowball fires Sergei's pet monkey out of a cannon, while freeing Daisy. The monkey lands on Max, knocking him off the train. Max, using his newfound bravery Rooster gave him, successfully jumps back onto the train from the top of a tunnel. The rest of the animals free Hu and kick Sergei out of the train. Before they can escape, Sergei stops them and plans to kill them all using a gun. Gidget and the rest of the pets knock him out with the cat lady's car and offer the animals a ride back home. Life resumes normally, with Hu finding a new home with Chloe, and Max sending Liam off to kindergarten, no longer worried for him.

Cast

 Patton Oswalt as Max, a Jack Russell Terrier. He was voiced by Louis C.K. in the first film
 Jenny Slate as Gidget, a white Pomeranian dog
 Harrison Ford as Rooster, a welsh sheepdog
 Tiffany Haddish as Daisy, a Shih Tzu
 Kevin Hart as Snowball, a white rabbit and a would-be superhero
 Eric Stonestreet as Duke, a brown Newfoundland mix who lives with Max
 Lake Bell as Chloe, a morbidly fat and apathetic grey tabby cat
 Nick Kroll as Sergei, an abusive circus owner
 Dana Carvey as Pops, an elderly Basset Hound whose back legs are paralyzed
 Bobby Moynihan as Mel, a hyperactive pug
 Hannibal Buress as Buddy, a laid-back dachshund
 Chris Renaud as Norman, a guinea pig
 Ellie Kemper as Katie, Max and Duke's owner
 Pete Holmes as Chuck, Katie's husband
 Henry Lynch as Liam, Katie and Chuck's toddler son
 Sean Giambrone as Cotton, a young lamb who Max and Rooster save from a cliff
 Meredith Salenger as a cat lady
 Michael Beattie as the lead wolf, the leader of Sergei's trained wolves
 Michael Beattie also voices a skinny cat
 Kiely Renaud as Molly, Snowball's owner
 Tara Strong as:
 Sweetpea, a budgie parakeet
 Pickles, an English Bulldog who is one of Pops' students in Puppy School
 Baby Liam
 Additional Voices
 Jessica DiCicco as: 
 Princess, a Poodle who is one of Pops' students in Puppy School
 Tiny, a young basset hound who is also one of Pops' students in Puppy School
 Additional Voices
 Garth Jennings as a hamster

Production
Universal Pictures and Illumination Entertainment announced a sequel to their animated film The Secret Life of Pets in August 2017 with director Chris Renaud and writer Brian Lynch returning, and Chris Meledandri and Janet Healy producing. The Oatmeal writer Matthew Inman worked on the film as a creative consultant.

Louis C.K. did not reprise his role as Max after being accused of and later admitting to sexual misconduct with several women in November 2017. Patton Oswalt took over for C.K. as Max the following year in April, while Jenny Slate, Kevin Hart, Eric Stonestreet, Ellie Kemper, Lake Bell, Dana Carvey, Tara Strong, Hannibal Buress, and Bobby Moynihan reprised their roles. Additional casting includes Tiffany Haddish, Nick Kroll, Harrison Ford and Pete Holmes.

Music

Alexandre Desplat, who composed the score of the first film, returned for the sequel. The soundtrack was released by Back Lot Music on May 31, 2019, featuring two cover versions of Bill Withers' "Lovely Day" and Paul Simon's "Me and Julio Down by the Schoolyard". The songs were performed by LunchMoney Lewis, Aminé, and Jack Antonoff.

Release

The Secret Life of Pets 2 was released in the United States on June 7, 2019 by Universal Pictures. It was previously set for a July 13, 2018 release, and then July 3, 2019. The film was released in the United Kingdom two months earlier on May 24.

Home media
The film was released on digital on August 13, 2019 by Universal Pictures Home Entertainment, with Ultra HD Blu-ray, Blu-ray and DVD releases following on August 27. It includes two mini-movies: Super Gidget, and Minion Scouts. The 4K Ultra HD version was also Universal's first release to use the HDR10+ format.

Reception

Box office
The Secret Life of Pets 2 grossed $158.9 million in the United States, Hawaii and Canada, and $287.4 million in other territories, for a worldwide total of $446.3 million, against a production budget of $80 million. Deadline Hollywood calculated the net profit of the film to be $118million, when factoring together all expenses and revenues.

In the United States and Canada, the film was released alongside Dark Phoenix and was initially projected to gross around $60 million in its opening weekend. The film played in 4,561 theaters, the second-widest release ever at the time. After making $17.4 million on its first day (including $2.2 million from Thursday night previews, down from the first film's $5.3 million), estimates were lowered to $46 million. It went on to debut to $46.7 million, less than half the opening of the first film, but still finishing first at the weekend box office. In its second weekend, the film made $24.4 million, finishing second behind newcomer Men in Black: International, and then made $10.3 million in its third weekend, finishing in fifth place.

In the United Kingdom, the film debuted to $4.1 million from 613 theaters on the May 24 weekend. A week later, the film expanded to Russia and added a combined $17.2 million from the two countries.

Critical response 
The site's critical consensus reads: "The Secret Life of Pets 2 doesn't teach its animated stars any new narrative tricks -- but for fans of the original, this funny, energetic sequel should still satisfy." On Metacritic, the film has a weighted average score of 55 out of 100, based on 26 critics, indicating "mixed or average reviews". Audiences polled by CinemaScore gave the film an average grade of "A−" on an A+ to F scale, the same score as the first film, while those at PostTrak gave it an average 4.5 out of 5 stars.

Courtney Howard of Variety magazine wrote: "It's unusual for a typical Illumination broad comedy to include a heartrending message that makes parents feel less alone in their very real, visceral struggles. It's just cloaked in a shenanigans-soaked romp about what pets do when humans aren't looking." James Berardinelli gave the film 2.5 out of 4 stars but called the film "a perfect example of what can happen when a sequel exists simply because its predecessor made a lot of money". He called it "a disappointingly mediocre effort that doesn't have a lot to offer potential viewers over age 10" saying it was unfocused and "essentially three separate shorts connected only by the presence of returning characters".

Emily Davison of UK Film Review called it "a much more enjoyable outing" and said the "voice cast is also strong all around".

Sequel
In March 2022, in an interview on the podcast The Gary and Kenny Show, Meledandri stated that a third film is in development.

References

External links

 
 

2019 films
2019 computer-animated films
2010s American animated films
2010s children's comedy films
American children's animated comedy films
American children's animated fantasy films
American computer-animated films
Animated films about dogs
Animated films about cats
Animated films about birds
Animated films about rabbits and hares
American sequel films
Animated films about tigers
Films about pets
Films scored by Alexandre Desplat
Films set on farms
Animated films set in New York City
Illumination (company) animated films
Universal Pictures films
Universal Pictures animated films
2019 comedy films
Films produced by Chris Meledandri
Films produced by Janet Healy
2010s English-language films